Tribune was a title shared by several political and military offices of the Roman Republic and Empire.

Tribune may also refer to:

Publications
 The Tribune (disambiguation), a list of newspapers
 La Tribune (disambiguation), a list of French-language newspapers
 Tribune (magazine), formerly weekly, now quarterly, left-wing magazine published in London, England
 Tribune (Australian newspaper), official newspaper of the Communist Party of Australia, from 1939–1991
 The Tribune (Chandigarh), Indian English-language daily newspaper
 The Express Tribune, a daily English-language newspaper based in Pakistan
 Tribun Network, a chain of newspapers published in Indonesia

Places

Canada
 Tribune, Saskatchewan, a Canadian village
 Tribune Bay, a bay of Hornby Island, British Columbia
 Tribune Channel, a strait in British Columbia, Canada
 , the southernmost tip of Gilford Island, British Columbia
 , in the Queen Charlotte Strait region of British Columbia (see Tribune Channel above for details)

United States
 Tribune, Kansas, a city
 Tribune Township, Greeley County, Kansas
 Tribune, Kentucky, an unincorporated community

In business
 Tribune Media, a media company based in Chicago, Illinois, United States
 Tribune Broadcasting, a group of television and radio stations owned and operated by the Tribune Media Company
 Tribune Publishing, a media company based in Chicago, Illinois, United States
 Tribune Studios (disambiguation), two business divisions

Other uses
 Tribune (architecture), in architecture, a term applied to various features
 a member of the Tribunate, a deliberative assembly during the latter stages of the French Revolution
 HMS Tribune, various Royal Navy ships
 A tradename for the herbicide diquat

See also
 Daily Tribune (disambiguation)
 Tribune Tower, headquarters of the Chicago Tribune, the Tribune Media Company and the Tribune Publishing Company in Chicago, Illinois, United States
 Tribune Tower (Oakland), home of The Oakland Tribune in Oakland, California, United States
 La Tribune des Peuples (March–November 1849), a weekly political magazine published in Paris, France
 Tribunal, in law, a generic term for any body acting judicially
 Progressive Democratic Tribune - Bahrain, a political party in Bahrain